Levanase (levan hydrolase, 2,6-beta-D-fructan fructanohydrolase) is an enzyme with systematic name (2->6)-beta-D-fructan fructanohydrolase. This enzyme catalyses the following chemical reaction

 Random hydrolysis of (2->6)-beta-D-fructofuranosidic linkages in (2->6)-beta-D-fructans (levans) containing more than 3 fructose units

References

External links 
 

EC 3.2.1